This is a list of all the candidates in the Belgian European Parliament election, held in 2009.

European Parliament

Electoral colleges

Dutch-speaking (13 seats)
Major parties:

Minor parties:

French-speaking (8 seats)
Major parties:

Minor parties:

German-speaking (1 seat)
Major parties:

Minor parties:

External links
 2009 elections

European Parliament elections in Belgium
2009 elections in Belgium
Lists of Belgian political candidates